Gopło Landscape Park also Gopło Millennium Park (Park Krajobrazowy Nadgoplański, Park Tysiąclecia) is a protected area (Landscape Park) around Gopło lake in north-central Poland.

Location
The Park lies within Kuyavian-Pomeranian Voivodeship: in Inowrocław County (Gmina Kruszwica), Mogilno County (Gmina Jeziora Wielkie) and Radziejów County (Gmina Piotrków Kujawski).

See also
 List of Landscape Parks of Poland

Notes and references

Landscape parks in Poland
Parks in Kuyavian-Pomeranian Voivodeship